The Javan plover (Charadrius javanicus) is a bird species in the family Charadriidae. It is endemic to Indonesia, where it inhabits sandy shores and intertidal mudflats. It is threatened by habitat loss but is listed as Least concern on the IUCN Red List.

References

Javan plover
Birds of Java
Birds of the Lesser Sunda Islands
Javan plover
Javan plover
Taxonomy articles created by Polbot